Ye Chugui (Chinese: 叶楚贵; Pinyin: Yè Chǔguì; born September 8, 1994) is a Chinese football player who currently plays for Chinese Super League side Guangzhou R&F.

Club career
Ye Chugui started his professional football career in 2011 when he was promoted to Dongguan Nancheng's squad for the 2011 China League Two campaign. He played 24 matches in his debut season as Dongguan Nancheng failed to promote to the second tier. Ye scored three goals in first five matches of 2012 season; however, he suffered a severe knee injury in May, ruling him out for the rest of the season. He followed the club to move to his hometown city Meizhou and rename themselves as Meixian Hakka in 2013. He scored 10 goals in 15 appearances in the 2014 season which made him the top goal scorer of China League Two.

On 9 December 2014, Ye transferred to Chinese Super League side Guangzhou R&F. He made his Super League debut on 3 April 2015, in a 4–0 home victory against Guizhou Renhe, coming on as a substitute for Abderrazak Hamdallah in the 70th minute. He scored his first Super League goal on 26 April 2015, which ensured Guangzhou R&F beat Changchun Yatai 2–1.
On 24 February 2018, Ye was loaned to second tier side Shenzhen FC for the 2018 season.

Career statistics

Club statistics 
.

Honours

Individual 
China League Two top scorer: 2014

References

External links
 

1994 births
Living people
Chinese footballers
Hakka sportspeople
People from Meixian District
Footballers from Meizhou
Guangzhou City F.C. players
Shenzhen F.C. players
Association football midfielders
Chinese Super League players
China League One players
China League Two players